C. occidentalis  may refer to:
plant
 Calyptronoma occidentalis, a palm species endemic to Jamaica
 Canna occidentalis, a garden plant
 Carex occidentalis, a sedge species
 Celtis occidentalis, the common hackberry, a tree species native to North America
 Cephalanthus occidentalis, the buttonbush, a flowering plant species native to eastern and southern North America
 Cercis occidentalis, the western redbud, a tree native to western North America
animal
 Crenadactylus occidentalis, tiny gecko species native to Western Australia

See also 
 List of Latin and Greek words commonly used in systematic names